Dihybrid cross is a cross between two individuals with two observed traits that are controlled by two distinct genes. The idea of a dihybrid cross came from Gregor Mendel when he observed pea plants that were either yellow or green and either round or wrinkled. Crossing of two heterozygous individuals will result in predictable ratios for both genotype and phenotype in the offspring. The expected phenotypic ratio of crossing heterozygous parents would be 9:3:3:1. Deviations from these expected ratios may indicate that the two traits are linked or that one or both traits has a non-Mendelian mode of inheritance.

Mendelian History 
Gregor Mendel was an Austrian monk who bred peas plants in his monastery garden and compared the offspring to figure out inheritance of traits form 1856-1863. He first started looking at individual traits, but began to look at two distinct traits in the same plant. In his first experiment, he looked at the two distinct traits of pea color (yellow or green) and pea shape (round or wrinkled). He applied the same rules of a monohybrid cross to create the dihybrid cross. From these experiments, he determined the phenotypic ratio (9:3:3:1) seen in dihybrid cross for a heterozygous cross. 

Through these experiments, he was able to determine the basic law of independent assortment and law of dominance. The law of independent assortment states that traits controlled by different genes are going to be inherited independently of each other. Mendel was able to determine this law out because in his crosses he was able to get all four possible phenotypes. The law of dominance states that if one dominant allele is inherited then the dominant phenotype will be expressed.

Expected genotype and phenotype ratios 
The phenotypic ratio of a cross between two heterozygotes is 9:3:3:1, where 9/16 of the individuals possess the dominant phenotype for both traits, 3/16 of the individuals possess the dominant phenotype for one trait, 3/16 of the individuals possess the dominant phenotype for the other trait, and 1/16 are recessive for both traits. Valid only for Angiosperms or similar sexually reproducing organisms. This is assuming that Mendel's laws are followed. 

The expected phenotypic ratio of 9:3:3:1 can be broken down into: 
 the 9 represents the proportion of individuals displaying both dominant traits: 1 x RRYY + 2 x RRYy + 2 x RrYY + 4 x RrYy
 the first 3 represents the individuals displaying the first dominant trait and the second recessive trait: 1 x RRyy + 2 x Rryy
 the second 3 represents those displaying the first recessive trait and second dominant trait: 1 x rrYY + 2 x rrYy
 the 1 represents the homozygous, displaying both recessive traits: 1 x rryy
 The genotypic ratio are: RRYY 1: RRYy 2: RRyy 1: RrYY 2: RrYy 4: Rryy 2: rrYY 1: rrYy 2: rryy 1
In the example pictured to the right, RRYY/rryy parents result in F1 offspring that are heterozygous for both R and Y (RrYy).

Another example is listed in the table below and illustrates the process of a dihybrid cross between pea plants with multiple traits and their phenotypic ratio patterns. Dihybrid crosses are easily visualized using a 4 x 4 Punnett square. In these squares, the dominant traits are uppercase, and the recessive traits of the same characteristic is lowercase.

 In the following case the example of pea plant seed is chosen. The two characteristics being compared are

 Shape: round or wrinkled (Round (R) is dominant)
 Color: yellow or green (Yellow (Y) is dominant)

 This implies that Rr will be a round seed and Yy will be a yellow seed.  Only rr will be a wrinkled seed and yy will be a green seed.

See also
Gregor Mendel
William Bateson
Mendelian inheritance
Law of dominance
Law of segregation
Law of independent assortment
Monohybrid cross

References

External links
 "Dihybrid cross" - The Mosby Medical Encyclopedia
 "Dihybrid Cross - A Genetics Definition" - About:Biology

Classical genetics